WTMB (94.5 FM) is a radio station broadcasting a Classic rock format. Previous formats for the station included new age as WZFR, country as WUSK, and oldies as WBOG. Licensed to Tomah, Wisconsin, United States, the station serves the La Crosse area.  The station is currently owned by Magnum Radio, Inc. and features programming from ABC Radio, Jones Radio Network and Premiere Radio Networks.

History
The station went on the air as WZFR on March 23, 1989. On December 20, 1994, the station changed its call sign to WUSK, then on February 3, 1997, to WBOG, and finally on November 19, 2003, to the current WTMB.

References

External links

TMB
Classic rock radio stations in the United States
Radio stations established in 1989